Carson Leighann Pickett (born September 15, 1993) is an American soccer player who plays as a defender for Racing Louisville FC of the NWSL and the United States national team.

Early life
Raised in Fleming Island on the northeastern coast of Florida near Jacksonville, Pickett attended St. Johns Country Day School and won 3 state championships with the soccer team. In 2012, she was named Gatorade Girls Soccer Player of the Year for the state of Florida and 2012 Florida Times-Union First Coast Player of the Year. Pickett was born without a left forearm and hand, a fact many reporters have highlighted throughout her career. Her condition was the subject of a viral Instagram photo during the 2019 season. The photo showed her "fist-bumping" a 2-year-old boy who was also born without a left forearm and hand, with both using their left arms to do so.

Florida State Seminoles, 2012–2015
Pickett attended Florida State University from 2012 to 2015, where she played soccer for the Florida State Seminoles and was a four-year starting defender. In 2014, she led the Seminoles to their first NCAA Division I Women's Soccer Championship anchoring a defense that allowed no goals throughout the tournament.

Professional career

Seattle Reign FC, 2016–2017
Pickett was selected by Seattle Reign FC (now known as OL Reign) as the fourth overall pick of the 2016 NWSL College Draft. Of the selection, Reign FC head coach Laura Harvey said, "Pickett is a player that we have been tracking closely for a long time. We were hoping she would still be available with our pick in the first round, so the choice to select her was an easy one. We think she will be a valuable addition to our squad during the upcoming season." She made her debut for the club during its season opener against Sky Blue FC on April 17.

Loans to Brisbane Roar 
In October 2017, Pickett was loaned to Brisbane Roar for the 2017–18 W-League. She scored her first professional goal on November 10, 2017, in the Roar's 1–0 win over Western Sydney Wanderers.

She returned for second and third loan spells during the 2018–19 W-League and 2019–20 W-League seasons. On February 23, 2020, Pickett had her first career multi-goal game when she scored twice in a 5–0 win over Canberra United. Pickett was named as the team's player of the year for the 2019–20 season.

Orlando Pride, 2018–2020 
In January 2018, Pickett and Christine Nairn were acquired by the Orlando Pride in a trade that sent Steph Catley to Seattle. Pickett played in nineteen of twenty-four matches (including sixteen starts) for an Orlando side that finished seventh in the league.

In March 2020, the impending NWSL season was postponed due to the coronavirus pandemic. An eventual restart was made through a smaller schedule 2020 NWSL Challenge Cup tournament. However, on 22 June, Orlando withdrew from the tournament following positive COVID-19 tests among both players and staff.

Loan to Apollon Ladies, 2020 
In August, having been unable to feature for Orlando Pride in 2020, Pickett moved to Cypriot First Division club Apollon Ladies on loan until November. She never made an appearance for the team.

North Carolina Courage, 2021–2022
On February 4, 2021, North Carolina Courage acquired Pickett in a trade with Orlando in exchange for the playing rights to Jodie Taylor.

International
Pickett has represented the United States on the under-17 and under-23 national teams.

On June 28, 2022, she made her debut for the United States national team against Colombia, becoming the first player with a limb difference to play for the USWNT.

Advocacy
In recent years, Pickett has become a significant advocate for limb difference awareness. In a 2020 interview for CBSSports.com, Pickett said,

She worked with Nike to develop the Phantom GT Academy FlyEase boots, designed with a fold-down heel and a wraparound strap closure in place of laces. In the aforementioned interview, she added,

Career statistics

Club

International

Honours 
Individual

 NWSL Best XI: 2021, 2022

See also
 List of Florida State University alumni

References

External links

 Seattle Reign FC player profile
 US Soccer player profile
 Florida State Seminoles player profile
 

Living people
1993 births
American amputees
American women's soccer players
United States women's international soccer players
Association footballers with limb difference
OL Reign players
Brisbane Roar FC (A-League Women) players
National Women's Soccer League players
Women's association football defenders
Soccer players from Florida
Florida State Seminoles women's soccer players
OL Reign draft picks
People from Clay County, Florida
Orlando Pride players
Expatriate women's soccer players in Australia
American expatriate women's soccer players
American expatriate sportspeople in Australia
American expatriate sportspeople in Cyprus
Apollon Ladies F.C. players
North Carolina Courage players
Expatriate women's footballers in Cyprus